The Wizard of Paws is an American reality show on BYU TV that follows Sterling, Virginia-based animal orthotist Derrick Campana as he creates prosthetic limbs for pets and sanctuary animals. The series premiered in April 2020 with a 10-episode first season, followed by three more seasons in 2021 and 2022. Nat Geo Wild shares the rights to the show, and some episodes are available on Disney+.

Campana attended Pennsylvania State University, where he earned an undergraduate degree in kinesiology and biomechanics in 2001, followed by Northwestern University where he graduated with a masters degree in orthotics and prosthetics. Starting in 2002, Campana worked on human prosthetics for a few years. He currently owns and operates Bionic Pets, specializing in prosthetics, and he remains a partner in Animal OrthoCare, which he founded in 2005 and sold in the 2010s. Campana was first featured on the 2018 Animal Planet show Dodo Heroes.

Episodes

Season 1 (2020)

Season 2 (2021)

Season 3 (2021)

Season 4 (2022)

References

2020 American television series debuts
English-language television shows
2020s American television series
Veterinary organizations
Veterinary medicine in the United States